The Embassy of Japan in Dublin is the diplomatic mission of Japan in Ireland. It is located in the capital city of Ireland, Dublin.

, the current Japanese Ambassador to Ireland is Mitsuru Kitano.

Diplomatic relations 

Relations between Japan and Ireland were formally formed in 1957 when Japan established a legation in Dublin after Ireland's separation from the British Commonwealth in 1949.

This legation was promoted to an embassy in 1964.

See also 

 Ireland–Japan relations
 Foreign relations of Ireland
 List of diplomatic missions in Ireland

References 

Diplomatic missions in Dublin (city)
Diplomatic missions of Japan
Ireland–Japan relations